James Cook University Singapore is a branch of James Cook University, based in Townsville, Australia. In addition to Singapore and Townsville, JCU operates another campus in Cairns, Australia. JCU Singapore was opened in 2003 as part of the university's strategic intent of "Creating a brighter future for life in the tropics world-wide through graduates and discoveries that make a difference". The university is ranked in the top 2%* of universities in the world and is the leading tropical research university in Australia. JCU Singapore fully adapts the Australian curriculum and all degree certification is awarded from James Cook University Australia. JCU is registered under the Committee for Private Education Singapore (CPE).

JCU Singapore's campus is located at 149 Sims Drive, in between the Kallang and Aljunied MRT stations.

Programs offered 

Currently, JCU Singapore offers pathway, business, education, counselling, psychology, environmental science, aquaculture, information technology, tourism & hospitality and urban planning courses at JCU Singapore. JCU Singapore is fully owned by James Cook University and all courses are provided by the university. This has seen enrolments increase as fewer students from the region choose to travel to Australia to study, instead electing to acquire an Australian qualification in Singapore.

JCU Singapore runs on a trimester system, allowing students to 'fast track' their studies and complete their degrees in as short as short as two (2) years, in comparison to other universities in the around the world. A majority of students intakes occur during March (SP51), July (SP52), and November (SP53).

Branch Campus Status 

In May 2016, the Singaporean and Australian governments concluded a review of the Singapore-Australia Free Trade Agreement, which added several measures to promote further cooperation on education. As part of this agreement, JCU Singapore was awarded branch campus status and from July 2016 is permitted to brand itself as the Singapore Campus of James Cook University. It had previously been legally known as James Cook Institute of Higher Learning.

Rankings
JCU has consistently ranked in the top 400 academic universities worldwide since 2010, as measured by the Academic Ranking of World Universities (ARWU). For 2016, JCU ranked in the top two percent of universities in the world by ARWU.

* unavailable data

In the Commonwealth Government's Excellence in Research for Australia 2012 National Report, JCU research received the highest ranking of 'well above world standard' (rating 5) in the areas of environmental science and management, ecological applications and medical microbiology. The university also received an 'above world standard' ranking for research in the areas of materials engineering, immunology, tourism, biological sciences, agricultural and veterinary sciences, fisheries sciences, veterinary sciences, inorganic chemistry, earth sciences, geochemistry, and geology.

Psychology Clinic 

James Cook University runs a psychology clinic from its Sims Drive Campus which is open to members of the public. This facility allows Masters students to gain practical experience under the supervision of qualified clinical psychologists, and offers counselling services to the public at a reduced price.

Graduate employment
In a survey conducted by Committee for Private Education on employment outcomes of 2018, graduates of James Cook University Singapore  achieved a 30.9% full-time employment rate in comparison with 78.4% for their peers from three autonomous universities - the National University of Singapore (NUS), Nanyang Technological University (NTU) and Singapore Management University (SMU). This result is lower than post-national service polytechnic graduates whose full-time employment rate was 64%. The response rate to the survey was 33%.

It also revealed that SIM graduates earned median gross starting salaries of $2,500 a month, while NUS, NTU and SMU graduates earned $3,400. Post-NS polytechnic graduates earned $2,480 a month.

References

External links 

James Cook University
Private universities in Singapore